Giraffoidea is a superfamily that includes the families Climacoceratidae, Antilocapridae, and Giraffidae. The only extant members in the superfamily are the pronghorn, giraffe, and okapi. The Climacoceratidae are also placed in the superfamily, but were originally placed within the family Palaeomerycidae.

Classification
 Superfamily Giraffoidea
 Family † Climacoceratidae
 †Climacoceras
 †Orangemeryx
 †Prolibytherium
 †Propalaeoryx
 †Nyanzameryx
 †Sperrgebietomeryx
 Family Antilocapridae
 Antilocapra 
 †Capromeryx
 †Ceratomeryx
 †Cosoryx
 †Hayoceros
 †Hexameryx
 †Hexobelomeryx
 †Ilingoceros
 †Meryceros
 †Merycodus
 †Osbornoceros
 †Ottoceros
 †Paracosoryx
 †Plioceros
 †Proantilocapra
 †Ramoceros
 †Sphenophalos
 †Stockoceros
 †Submeryceros
 †Tetrameryx
 †Texoceros
 Family Giraffidae
 †Canthumeryx
 †Georgiomeryx
 †Shansitherium
 Subfamily Sivatheriinae
 †Bramatherium
 †Decennatherium
 †Helladotherium
 †Sivatherium
 Subfamily Giraffinae
 Tribe Giraffini
 †Bohlinia
 Giraffa 
 †Honanotherium
 †Mitilanotherium
 Tribe Palaeotragini
 Subtribe Palaeotragina
 †Giraffokeryx
 †Palaeotragus
 †Samotherium
 Subtribe Okapiina
 Okapia

References
http://www.ultimateungulate.com/Cetartiodactyla/Antilocapridae.html

 
Pecora